Malindi is a town on Malindi Bay at the mouth of the Sabaki River, lying on the Indian Ocean coast of Kenya.  It is 120 kilometres northeast of Mombasa. The population of Malindi was 119,859 as of the 2019 census. It is the largest urban centre in Kilifi County.

Overview

Tourism is the major industry in Malindi. The city is popular among Italian tourists. Malindi is served with a domestic airport and a highway between Mombasa and Lamu. The nearby Watamu resort and Gedi Ruins (also known as Gede) are south of Malindi. The mouth of the Sabaki River lies in northern Malindi.

The Watamu and Malindi Marine National Parks form a continuous protected coastal area south of Malindi. The area shows classic examples of Swahili architecture. The majority of Malindi's population is Muslim.

Malindi is home to the Malindi Airport, Sai Eden Roc Hotel and Broglio Space Centre (the previous San Marco Equatorial Range).

History 

Malindi developed as part of the emerging Swahili Civilization in the 5th–10th centuries. Bantu-speaking farmers moved into the area, where they smelted iron, built timber and wattle houses thatched with palm leaves, spoke a local dialect of kiSwahili, and engaged in regional and sometimes long-distance trade. The resurgence of the Indian Ocean trade networks at the end of the first millennium led to larger settlements, increased long-distance trade, and greater social complexity. Beginning in the 11th century, the Swahili along the coast were acting as middlemen for Somali, Egyptian, Nubian, Arab, Persian, and Indian traders. They began building walled towns, coral houses, and elites converted to Islam, often speaking Arabic.

The Malindi Kingdom appears to have been formed around the 9th century AD and to have grown powerful in the two centuries before Vasco de Gama ushered in Portuguese colonization of the region, the latter leading to the decline of the civilization. The city of Malindi, founded around 850 AD, was in a somewhat more northerly location than the modern city, and appears to have been destroyed around 1000 AD. There are sparse signs of habitation for the next two centuries, then recovery and prosperity in the 1200s.

The first written reference to the present day Malindi likely comes from Abu al-Fida (1273–1331), a Kurdish geographer and historian. He wrote that Malindi is situated to the south of the mouth of a river which begins in a mountain hundreds of miles away. This mountain may be Mount Kenya, where the Galana River originates. Thus, Malindi has existed as a Swahili settlement since at least the 13th century.

Once rivalled only by Mombasa for dominance in this part of East Africa, Malindi has traditionally been a port city. In 1414, the town was visited by the fleet of the Chinese explorer Zheng He. Malindi's ruler sent a personal envoy with a giraffe as a present to China on that fleet.

The Portuguese explorer Vasco da Gama met Malindi authorities in 1498 to sign a trade agreement and hire a guide for the voyage to India, when he erected a coral pillar. Vasco da Gama was given a warm reception from the Shiek of Malindi, which contrasted with the hostile reception he encountered in Mombasa. The pillar stands to this day, though there have been calls by conservationists to take care of it, since soil erosion might make the pillar fall into the ocean. It is a fairly popular tourist attraction for both local and international tourists.

In 1498 Malindi was a prosperous town with a population between 5,000 and 10,000. The majority of the population was Muslim by this period, having converted largely between the 13th and 14th centuries. Like other Medieval Swahili towns, the ruling class or wazee was made up of the heads of the wealthiest patrician families. Similar to other Bantu-speaking peoples, these clan leaders elected a mwenye mui or chief who spoke on behalf of the patricians. The Portuguese mistakenly titled these individuals "Kings," misunderstanding the nature of Swahili political organization. The wazee spoke both Swahili and Arabic, and claimed mythological origins from the East, most often Persia.

Malindi's main source of prosperity was the export of ivory and rhino horns as well as exporting agricultural products such as coconuts, oranges, millet and rice. In the years before the arrival of the Portuguese, Malindi was a regional power but lagged significantly behind the two greatest states, Mombasa and Kilwa. When, in 1499, the Portuguese established a trading post in Malindi that served as a rest stop on the way to and from India, they were eagerly welcomed by the wazee who sought to use the Portuguese military might to establish themselves over their rivals in Mombasa. In 1500, King Dom Manuel I offered vassal status to Malindi. Malindi supported Portugal's successful efforts to conquer Kilwa and Mombasa in 1505. In 1509 the Portuguese established a factory (custom house) in Malindi, which they abandoned in 1512. The decline of Kilwa and Mombasa led to Malindi's flourishing. Malindi grew as other Swahili, as well as Arab, Persian, and Indian, merchants, craftsmen, sailors, and laborers flocked to newly powerful city.

Malindi remained the centre of Portuguese activity in eastern Africa until 1593 when the Portuguese moved their main base to Mombasa. This was through the help of the Segejus and the Sheikh of Malindi. As the major East African ally of Portugal along the Swahili Coast, Malindi supported Portugal's successful efforts to conquer Kilwa and Mombasa. The two Swahili city states often had feuds with each other as they fought for dominance over the trade. In his military struggles against Mombasa, the Sheikh of Malindi allied with the Portuguese and Segeju to take over the city. In 1592, the Segeju occupied Mombasa, eventually surrendering it to the Sheikh of Malindi. The Sheikh then moves his court from Malindi to Mombasa and rules from 1593 to 1630. During this time, he invites his allies, the Portuguese, to build a Garrison and they dominate the city.  After that the town gradually declined until it almost disappeared by the end of 17th century. In 1845 Ludwig Krapf visited the town and found it overgrown by vegetation and uninhabited.
A Portuguese chapel with a graveyard was built before 1542 when Francis Xavier visited the town. Many buildings of Swahili architecture survive, including the Juma Mosque and palace on the beach.

Malindi was conquered by Sultan Majid of Zanzibar in 1861 and until the end of 19th century served as a centre of the slave trade. In 1890 Malindi came under British administration. The British abolished both the slave trade and slavery. This act led to a significant decline in agricultural production. Outside agriculture there were few industries in Malindi at the beginning of the 20th century; among them were making mats and bags, crushing sesame seeds for oil and producing a Swahili drink called tembo. Malindi was officially made a town in 1903. Ten years later its population stood at around 1148 and included 843 Africans, 230 Arabs, 67 Asians and 8 Europeans.

Malindi experienced a trade boom between the end of the World War I and 1925, when a famine occurred. Exports to foreign ports grew to £26,000 by 1924. Europeans started to return to Malindi in the 1930s, buying land from Arabs. Some of them like Commander Lawford opened the first hotels, which became the foundation of the future tourist industry. During World War II Malindi was one of only two towns in East Africa bombed by the Italians. This happened on 24 October 1940, and after this event allied troops were stationed in the town until the end of the war. After the World War II Malindi began developing into a resort.

Climate
Malindi has a tropical dry savanna climate (Köppen climate classification As).

Local governance 
Malindi now falls under Kilifi County as per the administrative changes in the new constitution passed in August 2010.
Malindi forms a municipal council with the following thirteen wards: Barani, Ganda/Mkaumoto, Gede, Gede North, Gede South, Kijiwetanga, Madunguni, Malimo, Malindi Central, Malindi North, Maweni, Shella, Watamu Town. All of them are located within Malindi Constituency.

Gallery

In popular culture
The novel “MALI D’AFRICA” (by Sara Cardelli) describes an impossible love in Malindi.

Most of the events in Andrei Gusev’s novels Once in Malindi (2021) and Our Wild Sex in Malindi (2020)  take place in Malindi, Watamu, Lamu. The novels describes the living in these towns in the 2010s  of the protagonists: Russian writer Andy and his wife Jennifer, who was born in Kenya.

The song “Yasoi Malindi” was written by Yasoy Kala Kana about the town.

See also
Historic Swahili Settlements
Swahili architecture

References

External links 

 Malindi Municipal Council Website
 Malindi RFC website
Malindi Kenya Tourist Information Centre

Swahili people
Swahili city-states
Swahili culture
 
Athi-Galana-Sabaki River
Former Portuguese colonies
Kilifi County
Populated coastal places in Kenya
Populated places in Coast Province
Port cities and towns of the Indian Ocean
Populated places established in the 14th century
14th-century establishments in Africa
Ports and harbours of Kenya